The United States women's national beach handball team is the national team of United States. It takes part in international beach handball competitions.

Results

World Championships

Pan American Championships

References

External links
Official website
IHF profile

Women's national beach handball teams
Women's national sports teams of the United States